César E Chávez Boulevard is a street in Portland, Oregon, United States. Until 2009, it was known as Northeast and Southeast 39th Avenue.

History

Naming controversy
In July 2009, the Portland city council approved renaming all segments of 39th Avenue within the city limits as César E. Chávez Blvd in honor of Latino labor activist Cesar E. Chavez. Originally planned for December 2009, the first street sign with the new name was installed on January 29, 2010. The street bore signage of both the new name and the former name for five years.

The renaming process was very acrimonious. There had been a false start in earlier years with a prior street selection. Other streets nominated for selection included Fourth Avenue and Interstate Avenue. Opponents of any initiative to rename a street for the labor leader cited his overall lack of significant links to the Portland area. Supporters of the renaming initiative countered that Cesar Chavez had a presence in Oregon, with Colegio Cesar Chavez as one example. NE and SE 39th Avenues were finally selected, being an important through-way, but carrying an existing name which lacked toponymic significance to the history of Portland. (The number 39 was sequential and not historically significant.) Hispanics are the largest growing ethnic group in Portland, Oregon, and yet prior to the naming of César E. Chávez Boulevard no public location had been named after a Hispanic.

Transit
The street is served by TriMet lines 75 and 66. The discontinued bus line 74 no longer serves the street.

See also
 Hispanics and Latinos in Portland, Oregon
 List of streets in Portland, Oregon

References

External links
 
 Welcome to Portland's Cesar Chavez Boulevard

Hispanic and Latino American culture in Portland, Oregon
Streets in Portland, Oregon